Masak may refer to:

People

 Joanie Alice Masak French (b. 1995), Inuit-Irish-Canadian singer granddaughter of Alice Masak French
 Alice Masak French (1930–2013), Inuit-Canadian author
 Peter Masak (1957–2004), Canadian-American aviator
 Ron Masak (1936–2022), American actor

Other uses
 mashak, a South Asian bagpipe
 Masak Scimitar, an American glider designed by Peter Masak

See also